Island Pacific Supermarket, also known as Island Pacific Seafood Market, is a Filipino-American supermarket chain that operates 17 stores in California and Nevada. Headquartered in Walnut, California, the chain sells fresh seafood, meat, and produce, specializing in Filipino cuisine, though it also sells American staple foods.

History 
The founder and CEO of Island Pacific Supermarket, Nino Jefferson Lim, graduated from the University of Southern California with a bachelor's degree in accounting. He then decided that, instead of becoming an accountant in New York City, he would enter the supermarket business. In March 2000, he founded Island Pacific, opening his first location in Panorama City, Los Angeles, California.

Locations 
As of December 2021, Island Pacific operates 17 locations: 14 in California and 3 in Nevada.

2018 location closures 
Prior to April 2018, the chain operated 24 stores: 23 in California, and 1 in Las Vegas.
On April 4, Island Pacific announced it was holding liquidation sales at 6 California locations: National City, San José, American Canyon, Rancho Cucamonga, Chula Vista, and a location in Los Angeles.

Brands 
Except for Union City, all Island Pacific locations contain Philhouse, the chain's own fast food restaurant, which serves Filipino meals inspired by traditional home cooking.

Tenants 
In certain locations, such as Santa Clarita, Island Pacific hosts Crab Mentality, an Asian seafood chain, and Goldilocks, an Asian bakery chain.

See also
 Little Manila
 Asian supermarket

References

External links 
 Island Pacific homepage

Companies based in Los Angeles County, California
Walnut, California
Filipino-American culture in California
Supermarkets of the United States
Retail companies established in 2000
Supermarkets based in California
2000 establishments in California